Zhukovka is a town and the administrative center of Zhukovsky District in Bryansk Oblast, Russia, located on the left bank of the Desna River (Dnieper's basin)  northwest of Bryansk, the administrative center of the oblast. Population:

History
It was founded in 1868 as a railway station on the Riga–Oryol railway. In the years that followed, a settlement grew around the Zhukovka station. In 1914, there were fewer than 2,000 inhabitants. During World War II, it was occupied by the Germans on August 24, 1941. Town status was granted to it in 1962.

Administrative and municipal status
Within the framework of administrative divisions, Zhukovka serves as the administrative center of Zhukovsky District. As an administrative division, it is, together with seven rural localities, incorporated within Zhukovsky District as Zhukovsky Urban Administrative Okrug. As a municipal division, Zhukovsky Urban Administrative Okrug is incorporated within Zhukovsky Municipal District as Zhukovskoye Urban Settlement.

Transportation
The  railway branch line leads to Kletnya.

References

Notes

Sources

External links

Official website of Zhukovka 
Zhukovka Business Directory 

Cities and towns in Bryansk Oblast
Bryansky Uyezd
1868 establishments in the Russian Empire